Emilian is a Gallo-Italic language spoken in the historical region of Emilia, which is now in the northwestern part of Emilia-Romagna, Northern Italy. There is no standardised version of Emilian.

Emilian-Romagnol has a default word order of subject–verb–object and both grammatical gender (masculine and feminine) and grammatical number (singular and plural). There is a strong T–V distinction, which distinguishes varying levels of politeness, social distance, courtesy, familiarity or insult. The alphabet, largely adapted from the Italian (Tuscan) one, uses a considerable number of diacritics.

Classification

Emilian is a Gallo-Italic unstandardized language, part of the Emilian-Romagnol dialect continuum with the bordering Romagnol varieties.

Besides Emilian-Romagnol, the Gallo-Italic family includes Piedmontese, Ligurian and Lombard, all of which maintain a level of mutual intelligibility with Emilian.

Vocabulary

There is no widespread standard orthography. The words below are written in a nonspecific Emilian script.

Dialects
Linguasphere Observatory recognises the following dialects:
Mantovano, spoken in all north of the Province of Mantua in Lombardy. It has a strong Lombard influence.
Vogherese (Pavese-Vogherese), spoken in the Province of Pavia in Lombardy. It is closely related phonetically and morphologically to Piacentin. It is also akin to Tortonese.
Piacentin, spoken in the Province of Piacenza and on the border with the province of Parma. The variants of Piacentin are strongly influenced by Lombard, Piedmontese, and Ligurian.
Parmigian, spoken in the Province of Parma. The language spoken also in Casalmaggiore in the Province of Cremona.
Reggian (Arzân), spoken in the Province of Reggio Emilia, although the northern parts (such as Guastalla, Luzzara and Reggiolo) of the province are not part of this group and closer to Mantovano.
Modenese, spoken in the centre of the Province of Modena, although Bolognese is more widespread in the Castelfranco area.
Mirandolese dialect, spoken in the northern part of the Province of Modena, it is very different from the modenese dialect in the phonology, grammar and vocabulary.
Ferrarese, spoken in the Province of Ferrara (except for Cento and surroundings), southern Veneto, and Comacchio.
Carrarese and Lunigian dialects, spoken in Carrara, Lunigiana, and almost all of the Province of Massa and Carrara in northwestern Tuscany, and a good portion of the Province of La Spezia in eastern Liguria. Historically, this region has been part of Tuscany and the duchies of Modena and Parma at different times, so it has a close economic relationship with the Emilian area and is geographically proximate due to the Magra and Vara rivers.

Other definitions include the following:
 Massese (mixed with some Tuscan features)
 Casalasco, spoken in Cremona, Lombardy.

Phonology

Consonants 

 Affricate sounds [, ] can also be heard as alternates of fricative sounds /, / particularly among southern dialects.
In the Piacentino dialect, an // sound can be heard as either an alveolar trill [], or as a uvular fricative [] sound.

Vowels 

 Rounded front vowel sounds /, / and a mid-central vowel sound // are mainly common in the Piacentino and western dialects.
In the Piacentino dialect, five vowel sounds being followed by //, are then recognized as nasalized , unless // occurs between two vowel sounds.

 Vowel length is also distinguished for the following vowels .

Writing system
Emilian is written using a Latin script that has never been standardised, and spelling varies widely among the dialects.

The dialects were largely oral and rarely written until some time in the late 20th century; a large amount of written media in Emilian has been created since World War II.

References

Bibliography
 Luca Rognoni, Il sistema fonologico del dialetto modenese. L'Italia Dialettale 74, pp. 135–148, 2013.
 Colombini, F. 2007. La negazione nei dialetti emiliani: microvariazione nell’area modenese. University of Padua, MA Thesis.

Further reading
 Pietro Mainoldi, Manuale dell'odierno dialetto bolognese, Suoni e segni, Grammatica – Vocabolario, Bologna, Società tipografica Mareggiani 1950 (Rist. anast.: Sala Bolognese, A. Forni 2000)
 Fabio Foresti, Bibliografia dialettale dell'Emilia-Romagna e della Repubblica di San Marino (BDER), Bologna, IBACN Emilia-Romagna / Compositori 1997
 E. F. Tuttle, Nasalization in Northern Italy: Syllabic Constraints and Strength Scales as Developmental Parameters, Rivista di Linguistica, III: 23–92 (1991)
 Luigi Lepri e Daniele Vitali, Dizionario Bolognese-Italiano Italiano-Bolognese, ed. Pendragon 2007

External links

 Emilian basic lexicon at the Global Lexicostatistical Database

Emilia (region of Italy)
Emilian-Romagnol language
Languages of Italy
Languages of Emilia-Romagna
Languages of Lombardy
Languages of Liguria

pl:Język emilijski